The Woodwright's Shop is an American traditional woodworking show hosted by master carpenter Roy Underhill and airing on television network PBS. It is one of the longest running how-to shows on PBS, with thirty-five 13-episode seasons produced. Since its debut in 1979, the show has aired over 400 episodes. The first two seasons were broadcast only on public TV in North Carolina; the season numbering was restarted when the show went national in 1981. It is filmed at the UNC-TV (University of North Carolina Center for Public Television) studios in Research Triangle Park, North Carolina.

Overview
The Woodwright's Shop teaches the art of traditional woodworking, using hand tools and human-powered machines. Viewers learn how to make furniture, toys, and other useful objects out of wood. Viewers also learn how to lay out wood projects and which tools to use for specific purposes. The show also teaches viewers how to use tools properly.

The host, Roy Underhill, instructs viewers on creating wooden joints using hand tools and machine tools.

Wood joints
Underhill often shows the viewers how to create several useful and strong wooden joints, which are commonly used in carpentry.
 Mortise and tenon: This joint is often used for two pieces of wood that attach at right angles to each other in a "T" shape.
 Tongue and groove: Tongue and groove joints are typically used for large surfaces such as a series of wooden panels on a wall or a table top.
 Dovetail joint: This joint is typically used for the corners of boxes.
 Rabbet: A rabbet joint is one of the simplest joints used on the show.
Timber framing techniques are often used in conjunction with the wood joints described on the show.

Hand tools

Hand tools are a major focus of the show. All of the hand tools used on the show are manually operated (i.e. non-electric).
 Chisel: The chisel is one of the most commonly used tools on the show and is typically used to shave down material and to square up holes. 
 Wooden mallet: The mallet is often used to drive the chisel into the workpiece.
 Bow saw: The bow saw is often used by Underhill to cut large pieces of wood and to make curved cuts.
 Brace and bit: Most of the drilling on the show is done with a brace and bit which is a hand powered drill.
 Plane: Underhill uses the plane to level out surfaces and to square up joints.
 Hatchet: Large pieces of wood are cut down to manageable size with a hatchet.
 Drawknife: This tool is often used to quickly remove excess material.
 Adze: The adze is used to hollow out surfaces like a chair seat.
Proper handling and maintenance of tools is also part of the show. This includes the sharpening and sometimes making of tools, such as a scraper made from an old saw blade.

Machine tools
The most commonly used machine tool on the show is the lathe. Underhill typically uses a treadle lathe, but has also shown the viewers how to build and operate a spring pole lathe. He also often uses a gouge, in conjunction with his lathe, to remove material and smooth out a workpiece.

One of the simplest types of machines used on the show is a miter box. This is used to create square and perpendicular saw cuts, or to create saw cuts at a specific angle.

Early history
The show started as an idea that Roy Underhill had in 1976. He built a workshop and historic museum in Durham, North Carolina, in the mid-1970s. He called it "The Woodwright's Shop" and started teaching classes on how to build things out of wood.

Underhill pitched the show idea to the PBS affiliate in Chapel Hill in 1978 but was rejected. He tried again in 1979 and filmed a pilot. Only in the fall of 1979 was the show accepted. 1979 was the same year that This Old House started airing on PBS. Underhill admits that he made up the term "woodwright" and that it is not an actual term. Initially, he was concerned about using the made-up term in the show's title, but decided to use it anyway.

Production
The show has a tight filming schedule. The show does not have a real script; instead, Underhill works out the story he is going to present and how to do it. He decides where camera shots are needed and sets workpieces and tools in those locations. The filming of different shots is limited to three takes because of the limit of workpieces used on the show.

In recent years, the show is filmed in one take with no editing and as a result, the host is often out of breath by the end of the 24 minute program.

Injuries
The show also does not hide the nicks and cuts that come from woodworking with hand tools. The first such incident occurred in the third episode of the series, "Dumbheads in Action". A dumbhead is a clamping fixture on a foot-operated shaving horse used to hold unseasoned ("green") wood.

On one occasion, Roy seriously injured his hand with a hatchet. The scene was kept in the show because it was the last take of this particular scene. Underhill reviewed the take and felt that it gave the show some realism.

PBS funding
 State Farm
 The Cooper Group
 Corporation for Public Broadcasting
 John M. Olin Foundation

Host

Roy Underhill is the host and creator of The Woodwright's Shop. He graduated from the University of North Carolina at Chapel Hill with a B.F.A. in theater direction. Roy went to Duke University for environmental studies in the mid-1970s. For his thesis, he did a live presentation titled "How to start with a tree and an axe and build your house and everything in it." Somebody told him "You ought to do that on TV", when he was finished with his presentation.

He went on to work at Colonial Williamsburg as a carpenter, building houses the way they were built in the 18th century. During this same time, he also started producing The Woodwright's Shop television show for PBS. For 10 years, Underhill was a master housewright for Colonial Williamsburg. He helped with program development for another five years before he left over a disagreement about the authenticity of slave quarters on the project.

Roy has written several books on woodworking, most of which have been published by the University of North Carolina Press. Some of the books include, The Woodwright's Shop: A Practical Guide to Traditional Woodcraft and The Woodwright's Guide: Working Wood with Wedge and Edge.

Roy lent his woodworking expertise to the 2005 movie The New World about the founding of the settlement in Jamestown, Virginia, in the 17th century. He also taught actor Colin Farrell about woodworking for the film and acted as an extra in the movie.

Guests
Roy has had a wide range of woodworking professionals as guests on his show from many different fields of woodworking, Frank Klausz, Christopher Schwarz, Nora Hall, Steve Latta, David Calvo, Michael Dunbar, Dan Mack, Don Weber, Wayne Barton and Curtis Buchanan as well as many lesser-known specialists in the fields of tinsmithing, spoon carving, cooperage (barrels, buckets, canteens), lutherie (stringed instruments), whirligigs, archery, puppetry, basket making, spinning wheels and blacksmithing. Guests have also included famous people with a woodworking hobby, such as Governor Mike Easley. Roy's wife and children have appeared on various episodes over the show's thirty-plus-year span of production.

Episodes

Each season of The Woodwright's Shop consists of 13 episodes broadcast during the last 13 weeks of the year, typically starting at the beginning of October.

Video release
The show was first released on VHS tapes in 1993. In April 2012, Popular Woodworking announced an exclusive deal to bring the show to DVD, beginning with the first three seasons and Season 20.  The current season of the show can be watched online at the PBS video website. Also, the last few seasons of the show can be watched online at the official website.

References

External links

 
 The Woodwright's Shop at PBS

PBS original programming
1979 American television series debuts
Arts and crafts television series
Woodworking mass media
1970s American television series
1980s American television series
1990s American television series
2000s American television series
2010s American television series
2017 American television series endings
English-language television shows